Marc Brown Studios is a TV production company. Following the air of Arthur's Perfect Christmas, the Christmas special of the hit cartoon series Arthur, Marc Brown Studios was formed by Marc Brown in 2000 nationwide in the US. Marc Brown is the writer of the original Arthur book series that inspired the TV show.

Starting in July 2003, Marc Brown Studios produced Postcards from Buster.

Company 
Marc Brown Studios is the formal creative, corporate and production entity of children's book author and illustrator, Marc Brown. Formed a few years after the launch of the Arthur  television series on PBS, Marc Brown Studios was created to manage the rapidly expanding international licensing and publishing program associated with the show. Marc's oldest son, Tolon Brown, is also a member of the company and contributes to management of the licensing program as well as overseeing the production and development of on-screen media.

References

External links 
 The official website of Marc Brown Studios and author/illustrator, Marc Brown

Television production companies of the United States
Entertainment companies based in New York City